Vladimír Čáp (born 20 March 1976 in Ostrava) is a former Czech footballer.

References 
 Profile at iDNES.cz 
 
 Profile at SFC Opava official website 

1976 births
Living people
Czech footballers
Czech First League players
FC Baník Ostrava players
SK Dynamo České Budějovice players
Śląsk Wrocław players
Zagłębie Lubin players
SFC Opava players
1. FK Příbram players
Czech expatriate sportspeople in Poland
Association football defenders
Sportspeople from Ostrava
Expatriate footballers in Poland
FK Drnovice players
FK Frýdek-Místek players